The Roman Catholic Diocese of Guaranda is a diocese located in the city of Guaranda in the Ecclesiastical province of Quito. It was erected on 29 December 1957 from territory from the Diocese of Riobamba.

Bishops
Gilberto Tapia (10 Dec 1957 – 1958), did not take effect
Cándido Rada Senosiáin, S.D.B. (31 Mar 1960 – 24 May 1980)
Raúl Holguer López Mayorga (24 May 1980 – 18 Jun 1990), appointed Bishop of Latacunga
Miguel Angel Aguilar Miranda (11 Apr 1991 – 14 Feb 2004), appointed Bishop of Ecuador, Military
Ángel Polibio Sánchez Loayza (25 Nov 2004 – 20 Jul 2013), appointed Bishop of Machala
Skiper Bladimir Yáñez Calvachi (24 Jun 2014 - 27 Mar 2018), appointed Bishop of Babahoyo
Hermenegildo José Torres Asanza (4 Oct 2018–present)

Coadjutor bishop
Raúl Holguer López Mayorga (1974-1980)

Auxiliary bishop
Raúl Holguer López Mayorga (1973-1974), appointed Coadjutor here

Other priest of this diocese who became bishop
Fausto Feliciano Gaibor García, appointed Auxiliary Bishop of Riobamba in 2006

Special churches
The Santuario Nacional de Nuestra Señora María Natividad del Guayco is located within the diocese, in the parish of Magdalena, canton of Chimbo.

External links
GCatholic.org
Catholic Hierarchy

Roman Catholic dioceses in Ecuador
Roman Catholic Ecclesiastical Province of Quito
Christian organizations established in 1957
Roman Catholic dioceses and prelatures established in the 20th century